Ray Cillien (June 26, 1939 – September 22, 1991) was a boxer from Luxembourg. He was born in Esch-sur-Alzette. Cillien was member of the Luxembourgish Olympic team at the 1960 Summer Olympics in Rome. After a bye in the first round of the light-heavyweight division, he was eliminated in the second round by Soviet Gennadiy Shatkov.

1960 Olympic record
Below are the results of Ray Cillien, a light heavyweight boxer who competed for Luxembourg at the 1960 Rome Olympics:

 Round of 32: bye
 Round of 16: lost to Gennadiy Shatkov (Soviet Union) by decision, 0-5.

Professional boxing record

|-
|align="center" colspan=8|7 Wins (1 knockout, 6 decisions), 13 Losses (8 knockouts, 5 decisions)
|-
| align="center" style="border-style: none none solid solid; background: #e3e3e3"|Result
| align="center" style="border-style: none none solid solid; background: #e3e3e3"|Record
| align="center" style="border-style: none none solid solid; background: #e3e3e3"|Opponent
| align="center" style="border-style: none none solid solid; background: #e3e3e3"|Type
| align="center" style="border-style: none none solid solid; background: #e3e3e3"|Round
| align="center" style="border-style: none none solid solid; background: #e3e3e3"|Date
| align="center" style="border-style: none none solid solid; background: #e3e3e3"|Location
| align="center" style="border-style: none none solid solid; background: #e3e3e3"|Notes
|-align=center
|Loss
|
|align=left| Vittorio Saraudi
|TKO
|4
|13/08/1966
|align=left| Rimini, Emilia-Romagna
|align=left|
|-
|Loss
|
|align=left| Bjarne Lingaas
|PTS
|6
|10/12/1965
|align=left| Masshallen, Gothenburg
|align=left|
|-
|Loss
|
|align=left| Wim Snoek
|TKO
|2
|04/10/1965
|align=left| Luxembourg City
|align=left|
|-
|Win
|
|align=left| Valere Mahau
|PTS
|8
|28/06/1965
|align=left| Luxembourg City
|align=left|
|-
|Win
|
|align=left| Robert Jacobs
|KO
|7
|03/05/1965
|align=left| Esch-sur-Alzette
|align=left|
|-
|Win
|
|align=left| Karl Hermann Troche
|PTS
|8
|15/03/1965
|align=left| Esch-sur-Alzette
|align=left|
|-
|Loss
|
|align=left| Buddy Turman
|KO
|2
|13/02/1965
|align=left| Ernst Merck Halle, Hamburg
|align=left|
|-
|Loss
|
|align=left| Henri Corack
|RTD
|5
|21/11/1964
|align=left| Lannion, Cotes-D'armor
|align=left|
|-
|Win
|
|align=left| Henri Ferjules
|PTS
|8
|02/10/1964
|align=left| Esch-sur-Alzette
|align=left|
|-
|Loss
|
|align=left| Lennart Risberg
|PTS
|8
|09/05/1964
|align=left| Royal Tennis Hall, Stockholm
|align=left|
|-
|Loss
|
|align=left| Pekka Kokkonen
|KO
|2
|09/12/1963
|align=left| Helsinki
|align=left|
|-
|Loss
|
|align=left| Bas van Duivenbode
|PTS
|8
|04/11/1963
|align=left| Riviera-hal, Rotterdam
|align=left|
|-
|Loss
|
|align=left| Wim Snoek
|PTS
|10
|16/09/1963
|align=left| Riviera-hal, Rotterdam
|align=left|
|-
|Loss
|
|align=left| Joe Erskine
|TKO
|4
|29/07/1963
|align=left| Cardiff Drill Hall, Cardiff
|align=left|
|-
|Loss
|
|align=left| Giuseppe Migliari
|KO
|4
|22/02/1963
|align=left| Milan, Lombardy
|align=left|
|-
|Loss
|
|align=left| Yao Kouame
|PTS
|10
|09/12/1962
|align=left| Abidjan
|align=left|
|-
|Win
|
|align=left| Albert Duscha
|PTS
|8
|30/09/1962
|align=left| Luxembourg City
|align=left|
|-
|Loss
|
|align=left| Mariano Echevarria
|KO
|5
|13/07/1962
|align=left| Madrid
|align=left|
|-
|Win
|
|align=left| Guenter Huber
|PTS
|6
|28/01/1962
|align=left| Limpertsberg
|align=left|
|-
|Win
|
|align=left| Ivan Prebeg
|PTS
|8
|06/12/1961
|align=left| Bonnevoie
|align=left|
|}

External links
Association Luxembourgeoise des Olympiens
Ray Cillien's profile at Sports Reference.com

1939 births
1991 deaths
Light-heavyweight boxers
Luxembourgian male boxers
Boxers at the 1960 Summer Olympics
Olympic boxers of Luxembourg
Sportspeople from Esch-sur-Alzette